The Throes of Winter is the fourth extended play (EP) by American DJ and record producer Seven Lions. It was released on March 16, 2015, via Casablanca Records and Republic Records. The EP has charted on multiple Billboard charts such as the Billboard 200 and Dance/Electronic Albums.

Background
A follow-up to Seven Lions's Worlds Apart EP, The Throes of Winter consists of six songs featuring guest vocalists such as Haliene, Lynn Gunn, Sombear and Davey Havok, and songwriters such as Matthew Koma. AllMusic described the album as "skillfully pairing emotionally charged singer/songwriter pop with hypnotic dubstep." The EP was produced after Seven Lions worked with Casablanca to find vocalists that "match the songs".

Track listing

Charts

References

2015 EPs
Seven Lions EPs
Republic Records EPs
Casablanca Records EPs
Dubstep EPs